Hear You is the third studio album by Japanese math rock band toe. It was released in Asia through White Noise Records, Hong Kong on July 22, 2015 and worldwide through Topshelf Records on July 24, 2015. The album marks a shift toward a more minimal, vocally-focused sound and has received generally positive critical acclaim.

Critical reception

Joseph James of Will Not Fade said that "Hear You may be short, but it's so good that you'll likely find yourself listening to it on repeat anyway".

Track listing

References

2015 albums
Toe (band) albums
Topshelf Records albums